D304 is a state road connecting Kastav and parts of Rijeka with A7 motorway in Diračje interchange and terminating at D8 state road in Rijeka. The road is 7.1 km long.

D304 is fully incorporated in Rijeka and Kastav urban transportation systems.

The road, as well as all other state roads in Croatia, is managed and maintained by Hrvatske ceste, state owned company.

Road junctions and populated areas

See also
 State roads in Croatia
 Hrvatske ceste
 Autocesta Rijeka - Zagreb

Sources

State roads in Croatia
Transport in Primorje-Gorski Kotar County